Potentilla fissa, the bigflower cinquefoil, also known as the leafy cinquefoil, leafy drymocallis, or wood beauty, is a small plant also sometimes classified as Drymocallis fissa. It is a herbaceous plant with a thick taproot known for its moderately hairy leaves, redish leaf stems, and relatively large yellow flowers. It is native to foothills and lower mountains the Rocky Mountain region in the western United States.

Distribution
 Potentilla fissa can be found from northern New Mexico to Alberta, Canada, but is most commonly found in the Front Range mountains and lower foothills in Colorado and Medicine Bow Mountains of Wyoming. It has also been reliably observed in the Black Hills of South Dakota. The USDA records observations in San Miguel County, New Mexico; Carbon County, Montana; Stillwater County, Montana; and Custer County, Idaho as well as Oregon and Utah, but these are suspected of being misidentifications of other species.

Habitat and ecology
Bigflower cinquefoil is a perennial plant that often grows in mixed woodland habitats in the lower foothills, with sagebrush, on rocky slopes, and in open meadows at higher elevations. It is found from 1600–3000 meters in altitude. It prefers disturbed and rocky areas with more water, but not waterlogged soils.

Morphology
Individuals of this species have numerous stems that come from the top of a single rootstalk. The leaves are pinnate with 7-13 slightly hairy leaflets. Leaflet edges are incised to small points. The stems are hairy and redish. Plant usually most often has a cyme with multiple flowers per stem that is taller than the leaves coming up from the plant's base.

Flowers and fruit
The flowers are large as the common name suggest, 1.9 to 2.5 cm across, with five petals, colored bright yellow to creamy yellow. The center of the flower is also yellow and the anthers are long, helping to distinguish it from other species. In Colorado Potentilla fissa blooms in late spring to the very beginning of summer. The dry seed heads follow in July.

References

fissa
Flora of Colorado
Flora of South Dakota
Flora of Wyoming
Plants described in 1840